Jung Bahadur Kunwar Ranaji,  (born Bir Narsingh Kunwar, 18 June 1817; popularly known as Jung Bahadur Rana (JBR)) belonging to the Kunwar family was a Khas Chhetri ruler of Nepal and founder of the Rana Regime in Nepal. Jung Bahadur took control of the government after killing an alleged usurper Gagan Singh, who was accused of plotting with the junior queen in 1846 to become prime minister by putting the queen's son on the throne. His original name was Bir Narsingh Kunwar but he was popularly known as Jang Bahadur, a name given to him by his maternal uncle Mathabar Singh Thapa. Mathabar Singh Thapa used to call Jang Bahadur Jangay for his boldness.

His mother Ganesh Kumari was the daughter of Kaji Nain Singh Thapa, brother of Mukhtiyar Bhimsen Thapa of the then prominent ruling Thapa dynasty. During his lifetime, he eliminated the factional fighting at the court, removed his family's rivals like Pandes and Basnyats, introduced some innovations in bureaucracy and judiciary, and made efforts to modernize Nepal. He is one of the most important figures in Nepalese history. Some modern historians blame Jung Bahadur for setting up an oppressive dictatorship in Nepal that lasted 104 years- the dark period of Nepalese history. Other historians blame his nephews, the Shumsher Ranas, for the dark period. Rana rule is associated with tyranny, debauchery, economic exploitation and religious persecution.

Early life and family

Birth
Jung Bahadur Rana was born on 18 June 1817 at Balkot, Arghakhanchi. Jung Bahadur's birth name was Bir Narsingh Kunwar, and he was the eldest son of Kaji Bal Narasingh - a bodyguard of King Rana Bahadur Shah - and his younger wife Ganesh Kumari.

Ancestry

His father, Kaji Bal Narsingh Kunwar, was present on the court when King Rana Bahadur Shah was murdered by his own half-brother Sher Bahadur Shah. As an act of retaliation Bal Narsingh murdered Sher Bahadur Shah on the spot. For this act, he was rewarded with the position of Kaji, which was made hereditary to his family. Kaji Bal Narsingh Kunwar was also the only person allowed to carry weapons inside the court. Jung Bahadur was the grandson of Kaji Ranajit Kunwar and great-grandson of Sardar Ram Krishna Kunwar, an influential military leader at the times of King Prithvi Narayan Shah. He was related to the Thapa dynasty of Mukhtiyar Bhimsen Thapa through his mother Ganesh Kumari, and the aristocratic Pande family through his maternal grandmother Rana Kumari, who was the daughter of Kaji Ranajit Pande- an influential royal courtier.

Early life
Bal Narsingh Kunwar was the bodyguard of Rana Bahadur Shah. Bal Narsingh Kunwar's second wife Ganesh Kumari was the sister of Mathabarsingh Thapa. Bal Narsingh Kunwar 
Narsingh moved to Dadeldhura in 1833 where Jung Bahadur accompanied him and was enrolled in the Military. When Bal Narsingh moved to Jumla in the year 1835, Jung Bahadur was already promoted to the rank of Second lieutenant. In those days, the Thapas influenced the administration of Nepal. However, when Bhimsen Thapa was sacked in 1837, all of his relatives including Bal Narsingh and Jung Bahadur were also sacked from the services and their properties were seized. This incident made it difficult for Bal Narsingh to meet his family's everyday need. Jung Bahadur then went to Varanasi in search of work. After a brief stay in Varanasi, he returned to the Terai to work as a Mahout. He returned to Kathmandu in 1839 where his wife and infant son had already died.

Rise 

Jung Bahadur was married to the sister of Colonel Sanak Singh Shripali Tandon in 1839. Jung Bahadur received some dowry from his marriage which led to a slight improvement of his financial condition. King Rajendra went to Terai in 1840 where, coincidentally, Jung Bahadur accompanied him. Jung Bahadur impressed the King by displaying his fearlessness. The King was pleased with him and immediately gave him the position of Captain. Jung Bahadur was then taken in as one of the bodyguard of the Crown Prince. Legends say that, on the command of the Prince, Jung Bahadur jumped into the Trishuli River on a horseback.

After a while, Jung Bahadur was transferred from the Prince's group back into the King's. There he was appointed as a Kaji and was sent to the office of Kumarichowk. There he got an opportunity to properly understand the financial transactions of Nepal.

Jung Bahadur was known to be extremely ambitious. During those days, the youngest Queen was the actual ruler of the country with King only of name. Gagan Singh Khawaas was closest to the queen. Jung Bahadur had managed to please the Queen, the Prince and the Prime Minister with his diligent efforts. He had also managed to influence Henry Lawrence and his wife Honoria Lawrence.

When Mathavar was still the Prime Minister, a cousin of Jung Bahadur was sentenced to death penalty. Jung Bahadur had requested Mathavir to convince the Queen to excuse his cousin but Mathavar denied. This had resulted in Jung Bahadur holding grudge against him.

Jung Bahadur befriended Pandit Bijayaraj who was the internal priest of the palace, and from him he started to gain valuable information about the Durbar. He had also managed to befriend Gagan Singh Khawaas.

After assassinating Mathavar Singh, the queen gave Jung Bahadur the rank of a General and included Gagan Singh in the council of ministers.

Kot massacre 
The Kot massacre took place on 14 September 1846 when Jung Bahadur Rana and his brothers killed about 40 members of the Nepalese palace court including the Prime Minister, relative of the King, Chautariya Fateh Jung Shah, at the palace armory, the kot, of Kathmandu which rendered King Rajendra Bikram Shah and Surendra Bikram Shah powerless and the started the Rana autocracy.

By 1850, Jung Bahadur eliminated all of his major rivals, installed his own candidate on the throne, appointed his brothers and cronies in all the important posts, and ensured that major administrative decisions were made by him as prime minister.

Prime Minister 
After the Massacre, on 15 September the Queen appointed Jung Bahadur as the Prime Minister and the Commander-in-chief. After meeting with the Queen and the King, Jung Bahadur went to meet the Resident at the British Residency. There he informed the Resident about the massacre and also convinced him that the new government will have good relationships with the British. On 23 September all officers of military and bureaucracy were called upon to their respective offices within 10 days. Then, Jung Bahadur appointed his brothers and nephews to the highest ranks of the government.

Bhandarkhal massacre

The Queen commanded Jung Bahadur to remove Prince Surendra from the rank and declare Rajendra as the new Prince but Jung Bahadur ignored it which resulted in the Queen holding a vendetta against him. A few people who had survived the Kot Massacre were secretly planning to take revenge on Jung Bahadur. The Queen secretly contacted them and conspired to assassinate Jung Bahadur. A plan was formed to assassinate Jung Bahadur in a gathering to be organized in the garden of Bhandarkhal situated at the eastern end of the palace.

Jung Bahadur had already placed his spies inside the palace to gather information about the Queen and the events in the palace. These spies were handed the duty of informing Jung Bahadur about the happenings in a secret manner. A certain Putali Nani whom Jung Bahadur had already taken in his side also worked inside the palace and she informed Jung Bahadur about the conspiracy.

After receiving a command from the Rawal Queen to come to Bhandarkhal, Jung Bahadur took his fully armed troops and headed towards the garden. Birdhwaj was given the duty to bring Jung Bahadur in time. When he reached to the temple of Jor-Ganesh, he saw Jung Bahadur approaching with the troops. Sighting him, Jung Bahadur signaled Capt. Ranamehar and Ranamehar killed Birdhwaj Basnyat. The troops then marched towards Bhandarkhal where seeing Jung Bahadur approach fully armed with his troops, the conspirators started to flee. 23 people were killed in the massacre and 15 escaped. The next day, all property was seized of those who had been involved in this massacre. Jung Bahadur then imprisoned the Queen. Jung Bahadur then called for a meeting of the Council in the name of King Rajendra and charged the Queen of trying to assassinate the Prince and the Prime Minister. Queen right's were taken away at the agreement of council. The Queen asked Jung Bahadur to let her go to Benaras (Varanasi) with all her family which Jung Bahadur agreed to. The King went alongside the Queen.

The Battle of Alau 

After the massacres of Kot and Bhandarkhal, the Thapas, Pande's and other citizens had settled in Benaras. Similarly, some citizens had gone to settle in Nautanwa and Bettiah. Guru Prasad Shah of Palpa too had gone to live with the King of Bettiah. After knowing about the presence of the King and the Queen in Benaras, Guru Prasad went there and started to congregate an army and a plan to execute Jung Bahadur formed. After staying for about two months in Benaras, King Rajendra started to show interest in this conspiracy. The King met with Guru Prasad and assured him of his support for the plan.The King also provided some financial aid. After receiving the support from the King, Guru Prasad started to organize the Nepalese people living outside the country. They started gathering people who had come in search of work and started training them.

Meanwhile, the spies in Benaras who were analyzing each step of the King were providing reports to Jung Bahadur every week. Understanding the activities going on in Benaras, Jung Bahadur called a meeting of Council where he issued a charter mentioning, "Now we cannot obey the King, from now on we will work in accordance to the commands of the Prime Minister Jung Bahadur," and sent it to Benaras. After receiving such letter from Jung Bahadur, the King panicked and consulted with his new ministers as well as his Guru.

The Guru and others suggested the King to send a letter to the Army mentioning that the troops shall assist the King not the Prime Minister. The King put his stamp in the letter and sent it with Kumbhedan and Sewakram. They secretly reached Kathmandu and stayed in the house of one owner of Killagal. The spies of Jung Bahadur captured them from the house and destroyed the house the next morning. A pistol and a letter was found from them. Immediately, they were imprisoned and after a few days were hanged.

On 12 May 1847, Jung Bahadur gave a speech in Tudikhel. There he accused the King of attempted assassination of the Prince and the Prime Minister. The Council then decided to dethrone King Rajendra deeming him mentally ill, and on the same day Surendra was crowned as the new king of Nepal.

Hearing the news of the coronation of Surendra, Rajendra decided to take the responsibility of removing Jung Bahadur upon himself and declared himself the leader of the army. He then left Benaras. Rajendra then appointed Guru Prasad Shah as the Chief of the Army for the operation of removal of Jung Bahadur Rana from Nepal and started to accumulate weapons and training the troops. The training of the troops were done in the camp of the King of Bettiah who was a good ally of Rajendra. Along with this, some treasure and weapons were bought from secret groups in Benaras, Prayag, etc., and sent to Bettiah. The King of Bettiah also provided some arms and few elephants. A plan to attack Nepal was made.

Antagonism from the Company forced Rajendra and his troops to enter Nepal. On 23 July, the troops reached to a village called Alau in Parsa and set a camp there. The number of troops available at Alau was around three thousand, thousand less than the number at Betiah who had fled mid-way.

One spy group of the Government of Nepal was keeping close eyes on the event of the rebel groups at Betiah. They sent the news to Jung Bahadur, immediately after which he sent a troop in the leadership of Sanak Singh Tandon to Alau. They were told to suppress the rebellions, arrest Rajendra and bring him to Kathmandu. On 27 July, the Gorakhnath Paltan reached and rested in a village called  Simraungadh, not too far from Alau.

At dawn the next day the troops from Kathmandu started firing cannons at the camp. Great panic spread over the camp. Few armies from the King's side resisted and fought with Government forces. The former King too, for a certain period lead his troops. Guru Prasad fled from the location. Around a hundred soldiers of the King were killed in the battle and the King was captured and brought to Kathmandu.

The battle of Alau was a decisive one between the forces of King and Jung Bahadur. The King lost significantly in the battle. The battle of Alau had helped Jung Bahadur strengthen his dictatorship. Rajendra was imprisoned in an old palace in Bhaktapur.

Visit to Bisauli 
Towards the end of 1848 a vicious battle waged between the British and the Sikhs in Punjab. After hearing the news, Jung Bahadur met with the Resident and assured him of Nepal Government's support to the British. But the Governor-General rejected the proposal fearing the possibility of the Nepali troops changing sides with Sikhs. Jung Bahadur then decided to demonstrate his power to the English. He was passionate for hunting but after being the Prime Minister he had not found an opportunity to hunt. In 1848, Jung Bahadur planned to go to the Terai with a dual purpose, one for hunting another to show-off his power to the English. On 22 December, with the King and a large group alongside him, Jung Bahadur left Kathmandu. The group included thirty-two thousand soldiers on foot, fifty-two cannons, three hundred risalla and two hundred and fifty mules. After getting the information of this large a force nearby its boundary, the Governor-General sent a message to the Resident asking him to figure out the reality of the matter.

The King and Jung Bahadur then camped in a village called Bisauli which was not too far from the territories of the company. But the spread of cholera and malaria, which started killing the soldiers forced them to return.

Europe 

After the Treaty of Sugauli, the British had gained access to the internal matters of Nepal. Although the previous Prime Ministers of Nepal before him had somewhat resisted the Resident's involvement in the internal matter of Nepal, Jung Bahadur was of strong opinion that neither the Resident nor the Governor-General shall have any right to show involvement in the matters of Nepal. He therefore, wanted to establish a direct relationship between the Government of Nepal and the Queen and Prime Minister of Great Britain. He also had a keen interest in understanding the real power of the British. For these ends, he desired to travel to the Great Britain.

Jung Bahadur expressed his desire to the then Resident, Col. Thorsby. Thorsby suggested Jung Bahadur to write a letter, which he did, and sent it to Calcutta. The Governor-General conveyed the message to Britain where they accepted the request and also asked them (Governor-General) to manage the necessary provisions, after which, James Broun-Ramsay, sent a letter of acceptance to Kathmandu. The visit was to be of diplomatic nature and Jung Bahadur was to visit as a Royal Ambassador.

By placing his brother Bam Bahadur Kunwar as an interim Prime Minister, Badri Narsingh as the interim Commander-in Chief, on 15 January Jung Bahadur left Kathmandu to Calcutta. During his stay at Calcutta, he met with the Lord and Lady Dalhouse and participated in a royal program. He also went to visit the Jagannath Temple . On 7 April the Nepalese team left Calcutta in P & O Heddington.The ship reached the Suez Canal through Madras, Sri Lanka and Eden.

In Egypt, Jung Bahadur and the team visited Cairo and Alexandria where he met with Abbas Helmi. On 15 May 1850, the team reached Southampton.

In Britain, Jung Bahadur met and discussed various topics with Sir John Hubhouse, the chairman of the Board of Trade, the Duke of Wellington and others. On 19 June Jung Bahadur and Queen Victoria met at a program organized in the Royal Palace. Jung Bahadur also visited the Parliament and closely observed the workings of the House of Commons and the British system. He visited the ministers and dukes and in one such meeting he proposed a direct relationship between the British and Nepalese, which the British Government rejected.

In Scotland, he was welcomed by William Johnston (Lord Provost). There, he visited various forts and industries.

On 21 August 1850, Jung Bahadur and the team departed towards France. There he met with the then President of France. In France too, he expressed his desire to establish a direct relationship between Nepal and France, but the French President insisted on forming the relationship through the British Embassy, as there was no diplomatic relationship between the two countries. Jung Bahadur and the team stayed at France for about six weeks. On 3 October they departed from Paris and on 6 November reached Bombay.

In India, he married an Indian girl.

During his visits, he unsuccessfully tried to deal directly with the British government. The main outcome, however, of the tour was a positive development in British-Nepal relationship. Recognizing the power of industrialized Europe, he became convinced that close co-operation with the British was the best way to guarantee Nepal's independence.

On 29 January 1851, Jung Bahadur returned Nepal.

Muluki Ain 
Jung Bahadur was impressed by the rule of law, the parliament and the democratic system in Britain. In Nepal, yet, there were no written Acts. Different types of punishment were given to the similar kinds of criminal acts. Realizing that the prevalent system won't work for long term in Nepal, Jung Bahadur established a Kausal Adda in order to work on Acts. Selecting around two hundred members for the Adda, Jung Bahadur commanded them to draft legal codes as soon as possible.

The adda began its work by carefully studying the tradition, castes, race, class as well as religious situation of Nepal. Some members also studied the Hindu Ain being used in the courts of the English in the company. After three years of vigorous research, a detailed Act was prepared. This Act included the workings of Court, system of Punishment, and different Administrative sections. They however, could not address the issue of Caste inequality as a progressive policy on such could have resulted in protests and turmoils around the society.

On 6 January 1854, the Muluki Ain was enacted in Nepal.This Act cleared confusions concerning religious laws. The decisions on cases happened on time.

Jung Bahadur, with the Muluki Ain, formed the base of Law in Nepal.

Foreign relations

Nepal began to experience some successes in international affairs during the tenure of Jung Bahadur. To the north, relations with Tibet had been mediated through China since Nepal's defeat in 1792, and during the early nineteenth century, embassies had to make the arduous journey to Beijing every five years with local products as a tribute to the Qing emperor. By 1854, however, China was in decline and had fallen into a protracted period of disturbances, including the Taiping Rebellion (1851–64), revolts by Muslim ethnic groups north of Tibet and war with European powers. The Nepalese mission to Beijing in 1852, just after the death of the sixth Panchen Lama, was allegedly mistreated in Tibet. Because of this slight, the Nepalese government sent a protest letter to Beijing and Lhasa outlining several grievances, including excessive customs duties on Nepalese trade. In 1855 Nepalese troops overran the Kuti and Kairang areas. The Nepalese-Tibetan War lasted for about a year, with successes and failures on both sides, until a treaty negotiated by the Chinese resident and ratified in March 1856 gave Nepalese merchants duty-free trade privileges, forced Tibet to pay an annual tribute of 10,000 rupees to Nepal, and allowed a Nepalese resident in Lhasa. In return, Nepal gave up territorial gains and agreed that Tibet, would remain a tributary state subject to China. As the Qing dynasty disintegrated later in the century, this tributary status was allowed to lapse, and even Tibet began to shake off its subordination.

Begum Hazrat Mahal took refuge in Kathmandu with her 10-year-old son in 1859 Birjis Qadr and some other loyal staff. The then Prime Minister of Nepal, Jung Bahadur Rana, gave her shelter at the palace in Thapathali (which now houses an office of the Nepal Rastra Bank, Thapathali Durbar) according to Samim Miya Ansari. Jung Bahadur Rana took the step despite being in good terms with the British at the time.

In 1858 King Surendra bestowed upon Jung Bahadur Kunwar the honorific title of Rana, an old title denoting martial glory used by Rajput princes in northern India. He then became Jung Bahadur Rana, and the later prime ministers descended from his family added his name to their own in honour of his accomplishments. Their line became known as the house of the Ranas. Jung Bahadur remained prime minister until 1877, suppressing conspiracies and local revolts and enjoying the fruits of his early successes. He exercised almost unlimited power over internal affairs, often for his personal gains.

Titles
1817–1835: Jung Bahadur Kunwar
1835–1840: Second Lieutenant Jung Bahadur Kunwar
1840–1841: Captain Jung Bahadur Kunwar
1841–1845: Kaji Captain Jung Bahadur Kunwar
1845–1848: Kaji Major-General Jung Bahadur Kunwar
1848–1856: Kaji Major-General Jung Bahadur Kunwar Rana
1856–1857: Kaji Commanding-General Jung Bahadur Kunwar Rana, Maharaja of Lamjang and Kaski
1857–1858: His Highness Commanding-General Jung Bahadur Kunwar Rana, Maharaja of Lamjang and Kaski
1858–1872: His Highness Commanding-General Sir Jung Bahadur Kunwar Rana, Maharaja of Lamjang and Kaski, GCB
1872–1873: His Highness Commanding-General Sir Jung Bahadur Kunwar Rana, T'ung-ling-ping-ma-Kuo-Kang-wang, Maharaja of Lamjang and Kaski, GCB
1873–1877: His Highness Commanding-General Sir Jung Bahadur Kunwar Rana, T'ung-ling-ping-ma-Kuo-Kang-wang, Maharaja of Lamjang and Kaski, GCB, GCSI

Honours
Sword of Honour from Napoleon III-1851
India General Service Medal-1854
Knight Grand Cross of the Order of the Bath (GCB)-1858
Indian Mutiny Medal-1858
Knight Grand Commander of the Order of the Star of India (GCSI)-1873
Prince of Wales's Medal-1876

Ancestry

Film depictions
Basanti (2000 film), where he was portrayed by Neeraj Thapa
Seto Bagh, where he was portrayed by Bedendra Shamsher Jang Bahadur Rana popularly known as B.S. Rana

References

Footnotes

Notes

Books

Further reading

External links

 Biography of Jung Bahadur (Britannica)
Library of Congress
 Mc Findia
 Gautam, Prawash. (2011-10-02). Kot legacy and lessons. www.ekantipur.com. Retrieved: 26 December 2011.

 
1816 births
1877 deaths
19th-century Nepalese nobility
19th-century Nepalese politicians
19th-century prime ministers of Nepal
Honorary Knights Grand Commander of the Order of the Star of India
Honorary Knights Grand Cross of the Order of the Bath
Khas people
Nepalese expatriates in the United Kingdom
Nepalese Hindus
People from Gorkha District
Prime ministers of Nepal
Rana dynasty
Rana regime